This is a complete list of lieutenant generals in the United States Army before 1960. The grade of lieutenant general (or three-star general) is ordinarily the second-highest in the peacetime Army, ranking above major general and below general.

Originally created for George Washington during the Quasi-War with France, the grade lapsed for most of the 19th century and early 20th century because it was considered too lofty for the diminutive peacetime establishment. Unlike the grades of major general and below, the grade of lieutenant general was not considered a functional office during this period, but the penultimate military honor, reserved for only the most eminent of wartime generals. After the Spanish–American War, the lieutenant generalcy slowly transitioned from extraordinary accolade to routine appointment, and from permanent personal grade to temporary ex officio rank. The grade was revived permanently just before World War II and has been in continuous existence ever since.

Before World War I, there was at most one lieutenant general on active duty at any time. In 1918 two field army commanders received wartime commissions as lieutenant generals to accord them rank equal to allied counterparts, the first time the grade had been conferred purely to facilitate future command instead of to reward past service. Dozens of lieutenant generals were appointed during World War II to lead the vastly expanded military establishment, and by January 1, 1960, the official Army register listed 33 lieutenant generals on active duty in the peacetime Army.

Taxonomy
A lieutenant general of the line was an officer who was commissioned in the permanent grade of lieutenant general in the Regular Army and therefore maintained that rank regardless of assignment. (When the law passed in June 1916 in the reference, only major and brigadier generals were authorized in the US Army. No lieutenant generals were appointed as lieutenant generals of the line).
A lieutenant general of the staff was an officer who held the temporary rank of lieutenant general in the Regular Army only while occupying an office designated by statute to carry that rank, and who reverted to a lower permanent grade upon relinquishing that office.
An emergency lieutenant general was an officer whose Regular Army grade of lieutenant general was authorized only during the World War I emergency, which expired on June 30, 1920.
A temporary lieutenant general was an officer who was commissioned in the temporary grade of lieutenant general in the Army of the United States, typically in addition to a lower permanent grade in the Regular Army.
A brevet lieutenant general was an officer who held the rank of lieutenant general only by brevet, and remained commissioned in the permanent grade of major general.
Muir S. Fairchild is the only army general officer promoted in 1946 as first President and Commander, Air University.

List of U.S. Army lieutenant generals before 1960
The following list of lieutenant generals includes all officers appointed to that rank in the United States Army prior to January 1, 1960, including brevet and temporary lieutenant generals.

Entries are indexed by the numerical order in which each officer was appointed to that rank while on active duty, or by an asterisk (*) if the officer did not serve in that rank while on active duty. Each entry lists the officer's name, date of rank, date the officer vacated the active-duty rank, number of years on active duty as lieutenant general (Yrs), positions held as lieutenant general, and other biographical notes.

Timeline
An officer held the active-duty grade of lieutenant general (Lt.gen.) in the U.S. Army until his death; retirement; resignation; reversion to lower permanent grade upon vacating a position carrying the ex officio rank; promotion to a higher grade such as general (Gen.) or general of the Army (Gen.Army); or transfer to the U.S. Air Force (USAF). A brevet lieutenant general (Bvt.lt.gen.) remained in the grade of major general. Grades in the Continental Army (CA) did not continue with the U.S. Army.

History

Quasi-War

The rank of lieutenant general in the United States Army was established in 1798 when President John Adams commissioned George Washington in that grade to command the armies of the United States during the Quasi-War with France. The next year, Congress replaced the office of lieutenant general with that of General of the Armies of the United States but Washington died before accepting the new commission, remaining a lieutenant general until posthumously promoted to General of the Armies in 1976.

Mexican War

In 1855 Congress rewarded the Mexican War service of Major General Winfield Scott by authorizing his promotion to brevet lieutenant general, to rank from March 29, 1847, the date of the Mexican surrender at the Siege of Veracruz. As a lieutenant general only by brevet, Scott remained in the permanent grade of major general but was entitled to be paid as a lieutenant general from the date of his brevet commission, resulting in a public tussle with Secretary of War Jefferson Davis over the amount of backpay Scott was owed. Congress resolved all issues in Scott's favor once Davis left office in 1857, and allowed Scott to retire at full pay in 1861.

Civil War

The grade of lieutenant general was revived in February 1864 to allow President Abraham Lincoln to promote Major General Ulysses S. Grant to command the armies of the United States during the American Civil War. After the war, Grant was promoted to general and his vacant lieutenant general grade was filled by Major General William T. Sherman. When Grant became President in 1869, Sherman succeeded him as general and Major General Philip H. Sheridan succeeded Sherman as lieutenant general. Congress suspended further promotions to general and lieutenant general in 1870, but made an exception in 1888 to promote Sheridan on his deathbed by discontinuing the grade of lieutenant general and merging it with the grade of general.

In 1895 Congress briefly revived the grade of lieutenant general to promote Sheridan's successor as commanding general of the Army, Major General John M. Schofield. Schofield had lobbied for the grade to be permanently reestablished in order to cement the primacy of all future commanding generals over the Army's other major generals. However, Congress regarded the lieutenant generalcy as the penultimate military accolade, second only to promotion to full general, and refused to devalue the title's significance by conferring it on any future commanding general less eminent than previous recipients. Instead, Schofield himself was promoted to lieutenant general as a one-time personal honor eight months before he retired. In retirement Schofield argued that the rank of lieutenant general ought to be permanently associated with the office of commanding general, not the individual officers occupying it, and that an officer serving as commanding general should hold the ex officio rank of lieutenant general while so detailed but revert to his permanent grade of major general upon leaving office. Over the next five decades, Schofield's concept of lieutenant general as temporary ex officio rank would slowly prevail over the concept of lieutenant general as permanent personal grade.

Spanish–American War

The question of whether the lieutenant generalcy should be a permanent personal grade or a temporary ex officio rank was phrased in terms of the line of the Army, whose officers commanded combat formations, and its staff, whose officers performed specialized support functions. Permanent personal promotions to general officer grades were only available in the line, but staff officers could temporarily acquire general officer rank while detailed to an office bearing that statutory rank, so officers holding the permanent grade of general officer were called general officers of the line and ex officio general officers were called general officers of the staff.

In June 1900 Schofield's successor as commanding general, Major General Nelson A. Miles, was made a lieutenant general of the staff by an amendment to the United States Military Academy appropriations bill that granted the rank of lieutenant general to the senior major general of the line commanding the Army. Eight months later, the 1901 Army reorganization bill replaced this ex officio rank with the permanent grade of lieutenant general of the line. When Miles retired in 1903, the senior major general was Adjutant General Henry C. Corbin, but as a staff corps officer Corbin was ineligible to command the Army, so the lieutenant generalcy went instead to the senior major general of the line, Samuel B. M. Young. Young reached the statutory retirement age five months later and was succeeded by Adna R. Chaffee. Seniority and scheduled retirements suggested that Chaffee would be succeeded in 1906 by Arthur MacArthur Jr., but both Corbin and Major General John C. Bates were scheduled to retire for age that year and it was decided that MacArthur's ascension would not be materially delayed by first promoting Bates and Corbin to lieutenant general for the few months of active duty remaining to them.

Corbin's promotion became controversial when he declined to be detailed as chief of staff of the Army. Corbin felt the chief of staff should be a younger officer with the time and energy to enact a long-range program, not a superannuated placeholder on the cusp of retirement, so when Bates retired Corbin became lieutenant general but Brigadier General J. Franklin Bell became chief of staff. However, by divorcing the Army's highest grade from its highest office, Corbin had again reduced the lieutenant generalcy to a personal honor. Many in Congress believed Corbin was not in the same class as Grant, Sherman, Sheridan, and Schofield, and pressed to abolish the lieutenant generalcy immediately, but after a heated debate MacArthur's supporters managed to preserve the grade until after MacArthur's promotion.

MacArthur was promoted to lieutenant general in August 1906. Since he was the last Civil War officer expected to succeed to the grade, Congress stopped further promotions to lieutenant general in March 1907 and stated that the active-duty grade would be abolished when MacArthur retired. Later that month, MacArthur asked to be relieved of his duties, disgruntled at his anomalous position of being the ranking officer of the Army yet consigned to the command of a mere division and subject to orders from an officer he outranked, Chief of Staff Bell, whose four-year term extended beyond MacArthur's statutory retirement date. MacArthur returned home to Milwaukee, Wisconsin, where he marked time writing up travel reports until he retired in 1909.

World War I

In October 1917, Congress authorized the President to appoint as generals the chief of staff of the Army and the commander of the United States forces in France, and as lieutenant generals the commanders of the field armies and army corps, so that they would not be outranked by their counterparts in allied European armies. Unlike previous incarnations, these new grades were time-limited, authorized only for the duration of the World War I emergency, after which their bearers would revert to their lower permanent grades. The commander of the American Expeditionary Force, Major General John J. Pershing, was immediately appointed emergency general, as were two successive Army chiefs of staff, but no emergency lieutenant generals were named for over a year because the armies they would command had not yet been organized.

On October 21, 1918, Major Generals Hunter Liggett, commander of the First Army, and Robert L. Bullard, commander of the Second Army, were nominated to be emergency lieutenant generals, less than three weeks before the Armistice. With victory imminent, Secretary of War Newton D. Baker sought legislation to reward the Army's high commanders by making their emergency grades permanent. However, Army Chief of Staff Peyton C. March had alienated many members of Congress by unilaterally reorganizing the Army without their input and his enemies blocked every effort to honor any officer but Pershing with higher rank. In the end, Pershing was promoted to permanent General of the Armies, but March, Liggett, and Bullard reverted to their permanent grades of major general when their emergency grades expired on July 1, 1920.

After the war, there were a number of unsuccessful attempts to retire as lieutenant generals a list of officers that variously included Major Generals March, Liggett, Bullard, Enoch H. Crowder, Joseph T. Dickman, Leonard Wood, John F. Morrison, James G. Harbord, James W. McAndrew, Henry P. McCain, Charles P. Summerall, Ernest Hinds, Harry F. Hodges, William Campbell Langfitt, and George W. Goethals; Surgeon General Merritte W. Ireland; and Colonel William L. Kenly. Finally, on August 7, 1929, the Army chief of engineers, Major General Edgar Jadwin, was retired as a lieutenant general by a 1915 law that automatically promoted officers one grade upon retirement if they had helped build the Panama Canal. There was some consternation that a peacetime staff corps officer had secured more or less by chance a promotion deliberately withheld from the victorious field commanders of World War I, so the year after Jadwin's promotion all World War I officers were advanced to their highest wartime ranks on the retired list, including Liggett and Bullard.

In 1942, Congress allowed retired Army generals to be advanced one grade on the retired list or posthumously if they had been recommended in writing during World War I for promotion to a higher rank which they had not since received, provided they had also been awarded the Medal of Honor, the Distinguished Service Cross, or the Distinguished Service Medal; retired Major Generals James G. Harbord and William M. Wright were both advanced to lieutenant general under this provision.

Interwar

After Pershing retired in 1924, the rank of the Army chief of staff reverted to major general, the highest permanent grade in the peacetime Army. However, the Navy continued to maintain three ex officio vice admirals and four ex officio admirals, including the chief of naval operations, so in 1929 Congress raised the ex officio rank of the Army chief of staff to full general. In 1939 Congress also assigned the ex officio rank of lieutenant general to the major generals of the Regular Army specifically assigned to command each of the four field armies, allowing President Franklin D. Roosevelt to appoint the first new active-duty lieutenant generals since World War I: First Army commander Hugh A. Drum, Second Army commander Stanley H. Ford, Third Army commander Stanley D. Embick, and Fourth Army commander Albert J. Bowley. Congress extended similar rank in July 1940 to the major generals commanding the Panama Canal and Hawaiian Departments.

As general officers of the staff, these new lieutenant generals bore three-star rank only while actually commanding a field army or department, and reverted to their permanent two-star rank upon being reassigned or retired. However, during World War II most lieutenant generals of the staff received concurrent personal appointments as temporary lieutenant generals in the Army of the United States so that they could be reassigned without loss of rank. Postwar legislation allowed officers to retire in their highest temporary grades, so most lieutenant generals of the staff eventually retired at that rank. Of the lieutenant generals of the staff who were never appointed temporary lieutenant generals, Albert J. Bowley, Stanley H. Ford, Charles D. Herron, Daniel Van Voorhis, Herbert J. Brees, and Walter C. Short retired as major generals upon reaching the statutory retirement age; and Lloyd R. Fredendall qualified to retire in grade due to physical disability incurred during his term as lieutenant general. After the war, Brees and Short both applied to be advanced to lieutenant general on the retired list under a 1948 law; Brees was promoted but the administration specifically declined to advance Short, who had been relieved of command of the Hawaiian Department a few days after the defeat at Pearl Harbor.

World War II

In September 1940, Congress authorized the President to appoint Regular Army officers to temporary higher grades in the Army of the United States during time of war or national emergency. The first temporary lieutenant general appointed under this authority was Major General Delos C. Emmons, Commander, General Headquarters Air Force; followed by Major General Lesley J. McNair, Chief of Staff, General Headquarters, U.S. Army. In July 1941, retired four-star general Douglas MacArthur was recalled to active duty and appointed temporary lieutenant general as Commanding General, U.S. Army Forces in the Far East.

Dozens of officers were promoted to temporary lieutenant general during World War II. Lieutenant generals typically commanded one of the numbered field armies or air forces; served as deputy theater commanders; or headed major headquarters staffs, administrative commands, or support organizations. Officers were only allowed to retire in their temporary grades if they were retired due to disability incurred in the line of duty, but those compelled by good health to retire in a lower grade were eventually restored to their highest wartime ranks on the retired list.

Subject to Senate approval, anyone could be appointed temporary lieutenant general, even a civilian. In January 1942, the outgoing Director General of the Office of Production Management, William S. Knudsen, was commissioned temporary lieutenant general in the Army of the United States, the only civilian ever to join the Army at such a high initial rank.

Postwar

The modern office of lieutenant general was established by the Officer Personnel Act of 1947, which authorized the President to designate certain positions of importance and responsibility to carry the ex officio rank of general or lieutenant general, to be filled by officers holding the permanent or temporary grade of major general or higher. Officers could retire in their highest active-duty rank, subject to Senate approval. The total number of positions allowed to carry such rank was capped at 15 percent of the total number of general officers, which worked out initially to nine generals and thirty-five lieutenant generals, of whom four generals and seventeen lieutenant generals were required to be in the Air Corps. All Air Corps personnel were transferred in grade to the United States Air Force by the National Security Act of 1947.

Lieutenant generals typically headed divisions of the General Staff in Washington, D.C.; field armies in Europe, Japan, and the continental United States; the Army command in the Pacific; the unified command in the Caribbean; the occupation force in Austria; and senior educational institutions such as the National War College, the Army War College, and the Armed Forces Staff College. During the Korean War, the commanding general of the Eighth Army was elevated to full general, and the Eighth Army deputy commanding general and subordinate corps commanders were elevated to lieutenant general.

By mid-1952, the number of active-duty general officers had swelled to nearly twice its World War II peak. In response, Congress enacted the Officer Grade Limitation Act of 1954, which tied the maximum number of generals to the total number of officers. However, the real limit was the so-called Stennis ceiling imposed by Mississippi Senator John C. Stennis, whose Senate Armed Services Committee refused to confirm general or flag officer nominations beyond what he considered to be a reasonable total, which typically was much lower than the statutory limit. The Stennis ceiling remained in effect from the mid-1950s until the post-Vietnam War drawdown.

Unlike the temporary general and flag officer ranks of World War II, the 1947 ranks were attached to offices, not individuals, and were lost if an officer was reassigned to a lesser job. Army generals almost always preferred to retire rather than revert to a lower permanent grade. A rare exception was Lt. Gen. John W. O'Daniel, who temporarily relinquished his third star upon becoming chief of the Military Assistance Advisory Group in French Indochina so that he would not outrank the theater commander in chief, French lieutenant general Henri Navarre. O'Daniel got his star back five months later when France withdrew from Indochina following Navarre's defeat at Dien Bien Phu.

Legislative history
The following list of Congressional legislation includes all acts of Congress pertaining to appointments to the grade of lieutenant general in the United States Army before 1960.

Each entry lists an act of Congress, its citation in the United States Statutes at Large, and a summary of the act's relevance.

See also
Lieutenant general (United States)
General officers in the United States
List of American Civil War generals
List of United States Army four-star generals
List of lieutenant generals in the United States Air Force before 1960
List of major generals in the United States Regular Army before July 1, 1920
List of brigadier generals in the United States Regular Army before February 2, 1901
List of United States Navy vice admirals on active duty before 1960
List of United States Marine Corps lieutenant generals on active duty before 1960

Notes

Bibliography

Biographical registers

Other publications

United States Army before 1960
United States Army before 1960
 
Lieutenant generals before 1960
United States Army generals